The 1923–24 Lancashire Cup competition was the sixteenth competition for this regional rugby league tournament. The trophy was won by St Helens Recs who beat Swinton in the final at Central Park, Wigan, by a score of 17-0. The attendance was a new record for the competition final at the time, being 25,656 and receipts £1,450. The triumph by St Helens Recs was the first time the club had won the competition and also the first time that winning club were not one of the original clubs who formed the Northern Union.

Background 
The number of teams entering this year’s competition remained at 13, with again no junior/amateur team being admitted.  This resulted in 3 byes in the first round.

The quarter-final match between Warrington and Widnes took three matches to finally decide, the second replay being held at Central Park.

Competition and results

Round 1  
Involved  5 matches (with three byes) and 13 clubs

Round 2 – quarterfinals

Round 3 – semifinals

Final

Teams and scorers 

Scoring - Try = three (3) points - Goal = two (2) points - Drop goal = two (2) points

The road to success

See also 
1923–24 Northern Rugby Football League season

Notes 
 1 Central Park was the home ground of Wigan

References

RFL Lancashire Cup
Lancashire Cup